, also known as King of Lew Chew, or more officially , was a title held by several lineages from Okinawa Island until 1879. It effectively started in 1372 when Satto greeted a Chinese envoy from the newly established Ming dynasty although his son Bunei was the first to be officially recognized as the King of Chūzan. However, the official Okinawan narrative traces the line of succession further back to the legendary ruler Shunten, who supposedly ascended to the throne in 1187. Another peculiar feature of the official Okinawan narrative is the notion of the single line of succession, instead of Chinese-style dynastic changes, even though they clearly recognized that several unrelated lineages had taken over the position.

Early forms of the narrative 
The earliest known form of the narrative dates to the reign of King Shō Shin of the Second Shō dynasty. A stone monument dated 1522 makes reference to "three dynasties of Shunten's, Eiso's and Satto's". His son King Shō Sei expressed the line of succession in a slightly more elaborate form. The Katanohana Inscription (1543) reads: "Shō Sei, King of Chūzan of the Great State of Ryūkyū, ascended to the throne as the 21st king since Sonton [Shunten]" (大りうきう国中山王尚清ハ、そんとんよりこのかた二十一代の御くらひをつきめしよわちへ). Similarly, another stone monument dated 1597 states that Shō Nei is the 24th king since Sonton [Shunten] (しやうねいハそんとんよりこのかた二十四たいのわうの御くらゐ...). The numbers of kings mentioned in these monuments agree with those of the official history books compiled much later although it is not clear whether the individual members were fixed at this stage.

Historian Dana Masayuki relates the notion of the line of succession to Buddhist temples where ancestral tablets of the deceased kings were stored. According to the Chūzan Seifu, Manju-ji stored the ancestral tablets of Satto, Bunei, Shishō and Shō Hashi, while the tablets of Shō Taikyū and Shō Toku were at Tenkai-ji. Shō En, the founder of the Second Shō dynasty, established Tennō-ji and designated it as the family mausoleum. It is not certain which temples were dedicated to the missing kings of the First Shō dynasty, Shō Chū, Shō Shitatsu, and Shō Kinpuku. Nevertheless, each king performed "ancestral" worship for deceased kings from different dynasties in the presence of a Chinese envoy, presumably because they deceived the Chinese into thinking that the throne was normally succeeded from the father to the son.

According to the Ryūkyū-koku yuraiki (1713), Ryūfuku-ji in Urasoe, in addition to the above-mentioned temples, served as the royal mausoleum. This temple stored inkstone tablets representing the deceased kings from Shunten to Shō Hashi. According to the Chūzan Seifu, Ryūfuku-ji was originally founded by Eiso under the name of Gokuraku-ji and was re-established by Shō En. Dana Masayuki surmises that Gokuraku-ji used to serve not only as the family mausoleum of the Eiso dynasty but as the state mausoleum tracing the royal line back to Shunten. The apparent conflict between Manju-ji and Gokuraku-ji is resolved if Manju-ji is seen as a representation of the state in relation to China while Gokuraku-ji was the manifestation of Okinawa's own narrative.

Shō Shin established Enkaku-ji and transferred the function of the family mausoleum from Tennō-ji to Enkaku-ji. Shō Shin founded another temple named Sōgen-ji and decided to use it as the state mausoleum while the function of Enkaku-ji was clarified as the mausoleum of the Second Shō dynasty. He moved all ancestral tablets, starting from Shunten, to Sōgen-ji and thereby visualized the single line of succession based on Okinawa's own narrative.

Minamoto no Tametomo as the father of Shunten 
Minamoto no Tametomo (1139–1170), the uncle of the Kamakura shogunate's founder Minamoto no Yoritomo, has been consistently treated as the father of Shunten since the earliest official history book, the Chūzan Seikan (1650). The earliest known association of Tametomo with Ryūkyū can be found in a letter written by a Zen monk in Kyoto named Gesshū Jukei (1470–1533) with a request by Kakuō Chisen, another Zen monk serving to Ryūkyū's Tennō-ji. According to a tale which Gesshū attributed to Kakuō, Tametomo moved to Ryūkyū, used demons as servants, and became the founder of the state, which the Minamoto clan had ruled since then. The reference to demons may reflect the centuries-old Japanese Buddhist perception of Ryūkyū as the land of man-eating demons, as seen in, for example, the Hyōtō Ryūkyū-koku ki (1244). Although at this stage, Tametomo was not explicitly associated with Shunten, the tale apparently circulated in the network of Zen Buddhists connecting Kyoto to Okinawa. A similar tale was recorded in the Ryūkyū Shintō-ki (1606) by Jōdo-shū monk Taichū, who visited Ryūkyū from 1603 to 1606. This indicates that by that time, the tale of Tametomo had been known to non-Zen Buddhists. In light of these, the apparent innovation of the Chūzan Seikan (1650) was the explicit association of Tametomo with Shunten.

The tale of Tametomo had a profound impact on Ryūkyū's self-perception. In 1691, for example, the king ordered all the male members of the royal family to use the kanji Chō (朝) as the first of their two-character given names, presumably to indicate an affinity to Minamoto no Tametomo (源為朝).

Association of the foundation myth with the royal line 
Another innovation of the Chūzan Seikan (1650) was the association of the foundation myth with the royal line. The foundation myth concerning the goddess Amamikyu itself was recorded in the Ryūkyū Shintō-ki (1606).

Without showing a clear genealogy, the official history books connect the Tenson dynasty remotely to the Eiso dynasty. Eiso's mother dreamed that the sun intruded into her bosom, giving a miraculous birth to Eiso, but Eiso's foster father was said to have descended from the Tenson dynasty. Similarly, Satto was said to have been mothered by a swan maiden. Shō En was believed to have descended from Gihon of the Shunten dynasty (i.e., the second Shō family originated from the Minamoto clan), or some other king. It is not clear why the Chūzan Seikan did not provide a special link to the First Shō dynasty.

Official narrative

Tenson dynasty
The 25 generations of the Tenson dynasty ruled the land for 17,802 years, but their names are unknown.

Shunten dynasty
The Shunten dynasty lasted from AD 1187 to AD 1259.
In 1186, the 25th ruler's throne was usurped by Riyū. Minamoto no Tametomo's son Shunten overthrew Riyū the next year, becoming the king.

Eiso dynasty

The Eiso dynasty lasted from AD 1260 to AD 1349. In 1259, Gihon, who was the last king of the Shunten dynasty, abdicated his throne. Fathered by the sun, Eiso succeeded him. During the reign of Tamagusuku, the state was divided into three polities. The King of Nanzan (Sannan) and the King of Hokuzan (Sanhoku) came to compete with the King of Chūzan.

Satto dynasty 
The Satto dynasty lasted from AD 1350 to AD 1405. Satto, the son of a peasant and a swan maiden, replaced Seii as the King of Chūzan. Satto started a tributary relation to the Ming emperor.

First Shō dynasty
The First Shō dynasty lasted from AD 1429 to AD 1469. Shō Hashi, the virtual founder of the First Shō dynasty, overthrew Bunei in 1406. He installed his father, Shō Shishō, as the nominal King of Chūzan. Shō Hashi annihilated the King of Hokuzan (Sanhoku) in 1416. In 1421, after the death of his father, Shō Hashi became the King of Chūzan. He overthrew the King of Nanzan (Sannan) until 1429, unifying the island. The surname Shō (尚) was given by the Ming emperor.

Second Shō dynasty 
The Second Shō dynasty lasted from AD 1470 to AD 1879. When Shō Toku, the last king of the First Shō dynasty, died in 1469, courtiers launched a coup d'état and elected Shō En as king. He became the founder of the Second Shō dynasty. The kingdom was at its peak during the reign of his son, Shō Shin. In 1609, Satsuma Domain conquered the Ryukyu Kingdom. From then on, Ryūkyū was a vassal state of Satsuma Domain while the king was ordered to keep its tributary relation with China. The kingdom became a domain of Japan in 1872. In 1879, Japan replaced Ryūkyū Domain with Okinawa Prefecture, formally annexing the islands. King Shō Tai was dethroned and later given the title of marquis.

Honored as king posthumously

References

Citations

Sources 

 Kerr, George H. (1965). Okinawa, the History of an Island People. Rutland, Vermont: C.E. Tuttle Co. OCLC 39242121

External links
中山世鑑 
中山世譜

Ryukyu
Chuzan
Monarchs, Ryukyu
Monarchs, Ryukyu